The Roman Republic was the phase of Ancient Roman civilization characterized by a republican form of government. 

Roman Republic may also refer to:

History
Commune of Rome, an attempt to re-establish a republican form of government in Rome during the 12th century
 The regime established by Cola di Rienzo (May-December 1347)
Roman Republic (18th century), a state that existed in Italy from 1798–1800 as a client republic under the French Directory
Roman Republic (19th century), a short-lived Revolutionary state in 1849

See also
Republic of Rome (game), a 1990 strategy board game
Roman Empire (disambiguation)
Ancient Rome (disambiguation)